Margaret Phillips may refer to:

Margaret Phillips (actress) (1923–1984), Welsh actress
Margaret A. Phillips (born 1959), American biologist
Margaret Mann Phillips (1906–1987), British academic